Edgar Orlando Pineda Salazar (born April 1, 1988) is a Mexican professional footballer who last played for C.D. FAS.

References

External links
 

1988 births
Living people
Mexican footballers
Mexican expatriate footballers
Association football defenders
Club América footballers
Dorados de Sinaloa footballers
Unión de Curtidores footballers
Alebrijes de Oaxaca players
C.D. FAS footballers
Ascenso MX players
Liga Premier de México players
Primera División de Fútbol Profesional players
Mexican expatriate sportspeople in El Salvador
Expatriate footballers in El Salvador
Footballers from Mexico City